The Acheloos Painter, active around 525–500 BCE in Athens, was a vase painter of the black-figure style. His scenes were like those of the Leagros Group; however, unlike their work, his themes are comic episodes, like modern cartoons. Herakles was a favorite topic, as were banqueting scenes. His banqueters were portrayed satirically: overweight, aging, huge, jutting noses, and so on. The heroic is made anti-heroic by parody. His preferred vase forms are amphorae and hydriae.

Name vase
He received his name from a representation of a fight between the river god, Acheloos, and Heracles, on formerly Amphora F 1851 in the Berlin Antique collection, now missing. In this comic depiction, the screaming and frightened river god, in the form of a horned centaur, is being kept from escaping by an unflustered Herakles pulling him back by the horns. Hermes, stock messenger of the gods, sits at ease. His long, projecting beard juts out parallel to his long, projecting nose. In the heroic scenes of Greek mythology, a hero ought to be victorious over awful and implacable monsters according to the will of the divine gods. In this scene and others like it the hero demeans himself with a craven and ridiculous monster while the caricature of divinity slumps over in a state of ennui.  "Nonsense inscriptions" have nothing to say.

In an unrelated scene on the opposite side, a hoplite and an archer say goodbye to their aged parents. The wrinkles are shown in the mother's neck. The hoplite's shield covers him up to his nose. On it is emblazoned an isolated running leg with a naked buttock. A dog sniffs at the hoplite's groin region.

Selected works

See also 

 List of Greek vase painters

Notes

References

External links
 

Year of birth unknown
6th-century BC deaths
Ancient Greek vase painters
Anonymous artists of antiquity